Deyan Kolev  (18 December 1965 – 13 January 2013) was a Bulgarian gymnast. He competed at the 1988 Summer Olympics and the 1992 Summer Olympics.

References

External links
 

1965 births
2013 deaths
Bulgarian male artistic gymnasts
Olympic gymnasts of Bulgaria
Gymnasts at the 1988 Summer Olympics
Gymnasts at the 1992 Summer Olympics
People from Targovishte